Wheat mosaic virus can refer to a few different virus species:

 Chinese wheat mosaic virus, in the genus Furovirus
 High Plains wheat mosaic emaravirus, in the genus Emaravirus
 Japanese soil-borne wheat mosaic virus, in the genus Furovirus
 Soil-borne wheat mosaic virus, in the genus Furovirus
 Wheat streak mosaic virus, in the genus Tritimovirus